Vegan studies or vegan theory is the study of veganism, within the humanities and social sciences, as an identity and ideology, and the exploration of its depiction in literature, the arts, popular culture, and the media. In a narrower use of the term, vegan studies seeks to establish veganism as a "mode of thinking and writing" and a "means of critique".

Working within a variety of disciplines, scholars discuss issues such as the commodity status of animals, carnism, veganism and ecofeminism, veganism and race, and the effect of animal farming on climate change. Closely related to critical animal studies, vegan studies can be informed by critical race theory, environmental studies and ecocriticism, feminist theory, postcolonialism, posthumanism, and queer theory, incorporating a range of empirical and non-empirical research methodologies.

The field first began to enter the academy in the 2010s and in 2015 was proposed as a formal field of study by Laura Wright.

Development

Animal turn
Several works of philosophy and ecofeminism in the 1970s and 1980s—including Peter Singer's Animal Liberation (1975), Carolyn Merchant's The Death of Nature (1980), and Tom Regan's The Case for Animal Rights (1983)—triggered an animal turn in the humanities and social sciences: an increased interest in human–nonhuman relations.

The period led to the development of human–animal studies, which examines how humans and nonhumans interact, and, in the early 2000s, to critical animal studies (CAS), an academic field dedicated to studying and ending the exploitation of animals. Named in 2007, CAS grew directly out of the animal liberation movement. Criticizing human–animal studies as anthropocentric, and aiming instead for "total liberation" (including of humans), CAS scholars reject "speciesism and anthropocentric ethics" and declare themselves committed to the "abolition of animal and ecological exploitation, oppression and domination". Veganism is "a baseline for CAS praxis".

From the 1990s, several works of vegetarian studies appeared, informing the later development of vegan studies. These included Carol J. Adams's The Sexual Politics of Meat (1990), described as one of vegan studies' foundational texts, which deployed the idea of the "absent referent:" "The function of the absent referent is to keep our 'meat' separated from any idea that she or he was once an animal ... to keep something from being seen as having been someone." Adams linked vegetarianism to feminism, arguing that "the killing of animals for food is a feminist issue that feminists have failed to claim". Other works that influenced vegan studies include Nick Fiddes's Meat: A Natural Symbol (1991); Colin Spencer's The Heretic's Feast (1996); Tristram Stuart's The Bloodless Revolution (2006); and Rod Preece's Sins of the Flesh: A History of Ethical Vegetarian Thought (2008), published by the University of British Columbia Press.

Entry into the academy

In 2010 a United Nations Environment Programme report recommended a global move toward a vegan diet, which over the following decade became increasingly mainstream in the Western world. According to University of Oxford English literature scholars Emelia Quinn and Benjamin Westwood, veganism's "entry into the academy" also began around 2010. Shortly after the publication of her 2010 edited collection, Sistah Vegan: Black Female Vegans Speak on Food, Identity, Health and Society, A. Breeze Harper sought to apply "critical race and black feminist studies to vegan studies in the US". That year, the Journal for Critical Animal Studies published an edition devoted to the perspectives of women of color, which had been "eerily absent from critical animal studies and vegan studies in general".

In December 2013, Keele University media scholar Eva Giraud discussed the relationship of veganism to animal studies, ecofeminism and posthumanism. Academic work on veganism appeared in Nick Taylor and Richard Twine's 2014 collection, The Rise of Critical Animal Studies: From the Margins to the Centre, and in December 2014, Quinn and Westwood addressed a workshop at the University of York, organized by the art historian Jason Edwards for the 70th anniversary of the founding of the Vegan Society in the UK, to discuss "the fast developing field of vegan theory".

Proposal as a formal field of study 

Vegan studies was proposed as a new academic field by Western Carolina University English professor Laura Wright in October 2015 in her book The Vegan Studies Project: Food, Animals, and Gender in the Age of Terror, published by the University of Georgia Press and described as the "first major academic monograph in the humanities focused on veganism". Wright describes vegan studies as a "lived and embodied ethic" providing "a new lens for ecocritical textual analysis". Her work was prompted by research, for her doctoral dissertation, into J. M. Coetzee's Disgrace (1999) and The Lives of Animals (1999), and was influenced by Adams's The Sexual Politics of Meat. Wright framed vegan studies as "inherently ecofeminist", according to the literary scholar Caitlin Stobie. 

In 2016 Quinn and Westwood organized a conference at Wolfson College, Oxford, Towards a Vegan Theory, at which Wright gave the keynote address and Renan Larue, associate professor at the University of California, Santa Barbara, taught a course called "Introduction to Vegan Studies"

Other works in vegan studies include Jodey Castricano and Rasmus R. Simonsen's 2016 Palgrave Macmillan collection, Critical Perspectives on Veganism, a special cluster in the journal ISLE in December 2017, and a 2018 Palgrave Macmillan collection edited by Quinn and Westwood, Thinking Veganism in Literature and Culture: Towards a Vegan Theory, based on their 2016 Oxford conference. Through a Vegan Studies Lens: Textual Ethics and Lived Activism (2019) was published by University of Nevada Press and edited by Wright. Wright also edited The Routledge Handbook of Vegan Studies (2021).

In 2022

Characteristics

Scope, relationship to CAS

In 2016 Melanie Joy and Jens Tuider called vegan studies a "field of research whose time has come". It establishes veganism as an academic topic; gathers research on veganism, the history of veganism and carnism; examines veganism's ethical, political and cultural basis and repercussions; and explores how vegan identity is presented in literature, the arts, film, popular culture, advertising and the media.

According to Núria Almiron et al. (2018), vegan studies highlights the "oppositional role played by veganism towards ideologies that legitimate oppression" and how the media may misrepresent veganism. They view vegan studies and critical animal studies (CAS) as "related branches in the evolution of critical approaches to human domination". According to Alex Lockwood, a CAS theorist at the University of Sunderland, vegan studies offers a "radical and more coherent way of ensuring the present experiences of all beings are taken into account when examining the ways in which discourse shapes power".

Vegan studies analysis

Examples
Vegan studies scholars examine texts "via an intersectional lens of veganism", according to Wright, to explore the relationship of humans to their food sources and the environment. She offers as an example of a vegan studies analysis a 2017 article by Caitlin E. Stobie in ISLE about The Vegetarian by Han Kang, winner of the 2016 Man Booker International Prize. The novel tells the story of Yeong-hye who, after dreaming about animal slaughter, decides to stop eating animal products and refuses to have them in the house. She becomes increasingly distanced from her family and society, and slits her wrist when her father tries to force her to eat meat. "Can only trust my breasts now. I like my breasts; nothing can be killed by them. Hand, foot, tongue, gaze, all weapons from which nothing is safe." Rather than interpreting this as mental illness, Stobie views Yeong-hye's actions, according to Wright, as "a posthumanist performance of vegan praxis dependent upon inarticulable trauma and the desire for intersectional and interspecies connection".

Another example is Sara Salih's account, in Quinn and Westwood's 2018 collection, of "three scenes of failed witness", including when Salih left a formal lunch in tears when the chicken dish arrived, and when she and others stood staring (pointlessly, she felt at the time) at slaughterhouse workers using electric prods to push pigs off a lorry. Salih argues that there is, in fact, an ethical purpose to witnessing such acts. The witnessing outside the slaughterhouse was a performative act, an "illegal act un-sanctioning", directed at the workers. The third scene was when she left a friend's home, again in tears, having agreed to help prepare a meal, when her friend "dropped something soft and bloody into the frying pan".

Salih turns to Giorgio Agamben's Remnants of Auschwitz: The Witness and the Archive, comparing the Muselmänner in the camps, the "moving threshold in which man passed into non-man", to the "animalization of animals in slaughterhouses". At the time, she was feeding standard cat food to seven cats. "Why", she asks Derrida, who wrote about his cat in The Animal That Therefore I Am (2008), "have you chosen to turn towards this animal rather than that one?" She suggests that the scale of suffering makes "[o]ur imaginations baulk"; it seems absurd to understand that "we are in the presence of the dead ... when faced with a scoopful of kibble". Nevertheless she advises: "Look as closely as you can at your bowl or the neighbour's bowl or the cat's bowl, bear witness, and then decide whether the current norms of logic or rationality possess any moral validity."

In art

The British art historian Jason Edwards offers a vegan studies analysis of Diana and Chase in the Arctic (c. 1857) by James H. Wheldon. Diana and Chase were whalers from Hull, England. Between 1815 and 1825, Hull had 60 whalers, the largest whaling fleet in Britain. The animals were killed for their blubber, from which the oil was extracted to make candles, fuel lamps and lubricate machinery.

The painting shows groups of men pursuing whales, walruses and seals. Several men from the Diana are clubbing six seals. Three men are about to shoot two walruses. The whales are not easy to find in the painting, which aligns the viewer with the whalers. One whale has been harpooned and is bleeding, while three others are being chased. Two narwhals on the right appear injured and one is bleeding; Edwards writes that Wheldon fashioned these after John Ward's narwhals in The "Swan" and "Isabella" (c. 1840). The whales can probably hear each other struggling and dying, Edwards writes, but sound is "conspicuously absent from the eerily silent world of Wheldon's canvas".

Wheldon signed the canvas with the same vermillion paint he used for the blood and some of the whalers' clothes: "it is as if Wheldon is saying, 'this is a scene of moral darkness that I acknowledge as mine.'" Edwards suggests we also look for animals in the raw materials: the horsehair (or hog or badger) brushes and spermaceti candles. Seeking to introduce the perspective of ethical vegans, whose responses are probably very different from the majority, "their carnivorous or omnivorous viewing peers", Edwards feels the need to place himself between the bodies of the hunters and the animals, and between carnivorous viewers and the painting.

Sources

Notes

References

Works cited

Further reading
 
 H-Animal.
 
 "The Vegan Studies Project", The New School, YouTube, 26 October 2016 (dialogue with Laura Wright).

Ecofeminism
Environmentalism
Feminist movements and ideologies
Feminist theory
Postcolonialism
Posthumanism
Veganism